Philippimyia  is a genus of hoverfly in the family Syrphidae.

Species
Philippimyia cyanocephala (Philippi, 1865)

References

Eristalinae
Hoverfly genera
Diptera of South America
Taxa named by Raymond Corbett Shannon